Nadezhdinsky (masculine), Nadezhdinskaya (feminine), or Nadezhdinskoye (neuter) is the name of several rural localities in Russia:
Nadezhdinsky, Republic of Bashkortostan, a khutor in Ivano-Kuvalatsky Selsoviet of Zilairsky District of the Republic of Bashkortostan
Nadezhdinsky, Republic of Mordovia, a settlement in Novobayevsky Selsoviet of Bolsheignatovsky District of the Republic of Mordovia
Nadezhdinskoye, a selo in Birobidzhansky District of the Jewish Autonomous Oblast